Mattar paneer, also known as matar paneer, muttar paneer, and mutter paneer, is a modern restaurant-style and vegetarian North Indian dish consisting of peas and paneer in a tomato-based sauce, spiced with garam masala.

It is often served with rice and an Indian type of bread (naan, paratha, poori, or roti depending on region). Various other ingredients are often added, such as potato (aloo), corn, yogurt or cream.

Gallery

See also
 List of legume dishes
 
 
 
Paneer

References

External links

North Indian cuisine
Punjabi cuisine
Cheese dishes
Vegetarian dishes of India
Legume dishes
Tomato dishes
Indian cheese dishes